Carlos Martínez Díez (born 9 April 1986) is a Spanish former footballer who played as a right-back.

He spent most of his professional career with Real Sociedad, appearing in 209 competitive matches and scoring three goals.

Club career

Real Sociedad
Born in Lodosa, Navarre, Martínez joined Real Sociedad from local CD Izarra, aged 13. He made his senior debut with the former's B team, going on to spend two full seasons in the Segunda División B.

In the 2007–08 campaign, with the main squad in Segunda División after 40 years, Martínez started competing as a professional. He played his first league match on 26 August 2007 in a 0–2 home loss against CD Castellón, and scored his first goal on 25 November of that year to help the hosts beat Málaga CF 3–0.

Martínez contributed 23 games – 22 starts – in 2009–10 as the Txuriurdin returned to La Liga after three years, as champions. He made his debut in the competition on 29 August 2010 by featuring the full 90 minutes in a 1–0 home victory over Villarreal CF; in the following seasons, he battled for first-choice status with fellow youth graduate Dani Estrada.

In May 2018, after he made only a single Copa del Rey appearance since December 2016 due to injuries and the form of the emerging Álvaro Odriozola in his position, the club announced that Martínez would be departing from the club on the expiry of his contract at the end of the campaign, at the same time as long-time teammate Xabi Prieto.

Oviedo and Burgos
On 6 July 2018, Martínez signed a one-year deal with Real Oviedo in the second division. On 9 August 2019, he moved down one tier and joined Burgos CF; the following 15 January, he terminated his contract by mutual consent.

Martínez announced his retirement on 30 July 2020, at the age of 34.

Honours
Real Sociedad
Segunda División: 2009–10

References

External links
Real Sociedad official profile

1986 births
Living people
People from Ribera del Alto Ebro
Spanish footballers
Footballers from Navarre
Association football defenders
La Liga players
Segunda División players
Segunda División B players
CD Izarra footballers
Real Sociedad B footballers
Real Sociedad footballers
Real Oviedo players
Burgos CF footballers
Basque Country international footballers